Rt. Hon. Colonel Arthur Browne (14 March 1731  21 (buried 26) July 1779) was an Irish  politician.

He was a son of John Browne, 1st Earl of Altamont.

He sat in the House of Commons of Ireland from 1769 to 1779, as a Member of Parliament for 
Gowran from 1769 to 1776,
and for Mayo from 1776 to 1779.

References 
 

1732 births
1779 deaths
Irish MPs 1769–1776
Irish MPs 1776–1783
Members of the Parliament of Ireland (pre-1801) for County Kilkenny constituencies
Members of the Parliament of Ireland (pre-1801) for County Mayo constituencies
Younger sons of earls